Bohyeonsan may refer to:

 34666 Bohyunsan, a main-belt asteroid
 Bohyeonsan, a mountain in South Korea